Katalin Parragh (born 22 January 1972) is a Hungarian judoka. She competed in the women's half-lightweight event at the 1992 Summer Olympics.

References

1972 births
Living people
Hungarian female judoka
Olympic judoka of Hungary
Judoka at the 1992 Summer Olympics
Sportspeople from Pécs